Beauvoir-sur-Niort (literally Beauvoir on Niort) is a commune in the Deux-Sèvres department, Nouvelle-Aquitaine, western France.

See also
Communes of the Deux-Sèvres department

References

Communes of Deux-Sèvres